KRXO-FM (107.7 MHz) is a commercial radio station in Oklahoma City, Oklahoma.  It is owned by Ty and Tony Tyler's Tyler Media, L.L.C., and it carries a sports radio format.  The studios are on East Britton Road the northeast side of Oklahoma City. KRXO-FM is one of two Tyler Media stations in Oklahoma City that air a sports format, the other being KEBC (which mostly carries the SportsMap Radio Network).  KRXO-FM has mostly Oklahoma-based sports shows with SportsMap heard late nights and weekends.

KRXO-FM has an effective radiated power (ERP) of 92,000 watts.  The transmitter is off Ridgeway Road in Northeast Oklahoma City, amid the towers for other FM and TV stations in the market.  KRXO-FM broadcasts using HD Radio technology.  The HD-2 digital subchannel carries a Classic Rock format and feeds FM translator K283BW at 104.5 MHz.  The HD3 subchannel carries a Spanish Classic Hits format and feeds FM translator K243BJ at 96.5 MHz.

History

Urban AC and Classic Rock

The station began broadcasting in 1976 with the call letters KAEZ.  The call sign stood for "Eazy 107" and it played an Urban Adult Contemporary format that included a wide-ranging playlist of R&B, soul, jazz and blues. The station played very little hip hop or rap music in the early 1980s. KAEZ remained on the air until November 23, 1985, when the station had a fire that silenced the station along with going bankrupt causing the station to be sold to Price Communications.

On February 25, 1986, the station returned to air.  The call sign was changed to KIMY ("My 107.7") and it switched to adult contemporary music.  Then on August 7, 1987, it switched to classic rock as KRXO.  The classic rock format stayed in place for 26 years.

Ownership changes
On July 15, 2012, Tyler Media entered into an agreement with Renda Broadcasting to purchase that company's Oklahoma City radio stations.  That cluster was made up of KMGL, KOMA, KRXO and KOKC, and the price tag was $40 million.

In accordance to limits imposed by the Federal Communications Commission on the number of radio stations a single broadcasting entity can own in a single market, Tyler sold KTLR and KKNG to WPA Radio for $1.6 million. Tyler's purchase of KRXO and its sister stations was consummated on November 13, 2012.

Switch to Sports
On July 10, 2013, Tyler Media announced that the station would adopt an All-Sports format, and be known as "107.7 The Franchise" replacing the station's longtime Classic Rock format.  That programming and format moved to KRXO-HD2, a digital subchannel which is also simulcast on translator K283BW at 104.5 MHz. The Franchise officially launched on August 22, 2013, at 2pm. The move was made due to declining ratings for the classic rock format as well as to protect sister station KOMA (whose playlist overlapped with KRXO's). Programming includes University of Oklahoma Sooners football and basketball, as well as NFL games on Sunday, Monday and Thursday nights.

On September 16, 2015, Tyler Media filed to change the call sign to "KRXO-FM" and move the "KRXO" call sign to a co-owned sports station in Tulsa. The call sign change to KRXO-FM occurred on September 23, 2015.  The Tulsa station shared some Oklahoma-based sports programming with KRXO-FM until it flipped to a Spanish language format in 2020.

HD Radio
KRXO-FM transmits an HD Radio signal.  That allows them to transmit the main programming on their first digital subchannel, while second and third subchannels carry other programming for listeners with HD Radio-capable receivers. The programming is also relayed on analog translators for those without HD Radio-capable receivers.

In 2005, Tony Renda Jr., the general manager of Renda Broadcasting, said his company had signed a deal with iBiquity to start offering HD Radio on the company's 24 stations in Pennsylvania, Florida, and Oklahoma in 2006.

University of Oklahoma sports fans with radios at the stadium had complained that the station's play-by-play was behind the actual game action.  As a result, KRXO's HD Radio digital signal is often disabled during its University of Oklahoma football broadcasts.

KRXO-FM-HD2 
104.5's life began in August 2013 when it started to simulcast KRXO and its outgoing classic rock format. When KRXO's main analog signal flipped to its current sports format, K283BW and KRXO-HD2 continued to carry the classic rock programming that had been discarded from 107.7. KRXO-FM-HD2 is branded as 104.5 KRXO after the translator's frequency. K283BW broadcasts from a tower located in Northeast Oklahoma City that is also used by other radio and television stations in the market. KRXO-FM-HD2 features air personalities who are also heard on other stations in the Tyler Media cluster.

KRXO-FM-HD3 
KRXO-FM-HD3 originates a Spanish oldies format branded as "Éxitos 96.5". The programming is repeated on analog translator K243BJ at 96.5 MHz for those without HD Radios. K243BJ broadcasts from a tower located at Tyler Media's headquarters and Spanish-language broadcast complex (5101 South Shields Drive in South Oklahoma City). The studios for KRXO-FM-HD3 are located there as well (separately from its English-language sister stations). 

Originally a relay for KEBC, K243BJ/KRXO-FM-HD3 flipped to Top 40/CHR as "Now 96.5" on September 12, 2013. In November 2014, "Now" was moved to K225BN/KOMA-HD2 and rebranded as "Now 92.9"; after the move, K243BJ/KRXO-FM-HD3 flipped to the current Spanish oldies format.

Notable people

Current
Kelly Gregg, former Oklahoma Sooners football player and the Baltimore Ravens and Kansas City Chiefs

Former
Tony Casillas, former Oklahoma Sooners football player, NFL veteran, member of the College Football Hall of Fame
Dave Garrett, former New Orleans Saints and Dallas Cowboys play-by-play radio voice

References

External links
KRXO official website
KRXO-HD2 official website

RXO-FM
Sports radio stations in the United States
Radio stations established in 1976
1976 establishments in Oklahoma